Olive Township is one of thirteen townships in St. Joseph County, in the U.S. state of Indiana. As of the 2000 census, its population was 3,914.

Geography

Cities, towns, villages
 New Carlisle

Unincorporated towns
 Hamilton at 
 Olive at 
 Terre Coupee at 
 Zeigler at 
(This list is based on USGS data and may include former settlements.)

Adjacent townships
 Bertrand Township, Berrien County, Michigan (northeast)
 Warren Township (east)
 Greene Township (southeast)
 Lincoln Township, LaPorte County (southwest)
 Wills Township, LaPorte County (southwest)
 Galien Township, Berrien County, Michigan (northwest)
 Hudson Township, LaPorte County (northwest)

Cemeteries
The township contains Olive Chapel Cemetery.

Major highways

Airports and landing strips
 Hustons Airport

Lakes
 Lancaster Lake
 Spicer Lake

History 
Olive Township was formed in 1830. The township was named for Olive Stanton Vail, the wife of an early settler.

The Haven Hubbard Home and Studebaker Clubhouse and Tree Sign are listed on the National Register of Historic Places.

Education
 New Prairie United School Corporation

Olive Township is served by the New Carlisle-Olive Township Public Library.

Political districts
 Indiana's 2nd congressional district
 State House District 7
 State Senate District 8

References
 United States Census Bureau 2008 TIGER/Line Shapefiles
 United States Board on Geographic Names (GNIS)
 IndianaMap

External links
 Indiana Township Association
 United Township Association of Indiana

Townships in St. Joseph County, Indiana
South Bend – Mishawaka metropolitan area
Populated places established in 1830
1830 establishments in Indiana
Townships in Indiana